Oak Hill was a historic plantation home located near Oak Ridge, Pittsylvania County, Virginia. It was built in 1823–1825, and was a -story, five bay, Federal style brick dwelling with a gable roof.  An addition was built in 1899.  It was destroyed by fire in 1988.

It was listed on the National Register of Historic Places in 1979, and delisted in 2001.

References

Former National Register of Historic Places in Virginia
Houses on the National Register of Historic Places in Virginia
Federal architecture in Virginia
Houses completed in 1825
Houses in Pittsylvania County, Virginia
National Register of Historic Places in Pittsylvania County, Virginia